The 40th District of the Iowa House of Representatives in the state of Iowa.

Current elected officials
John Forbes is the representative currently representing the district.

Past representatives
The district has previously been represented by:
 Barton L. Schwieger, 1971–1973
 James C. West, 1973–1981
 Lisle M. Cook, 1981–1983
 Donald F. Hermann, 1983–1991
 David A. Millage, 1991–1993
 Steven E. Grubbs, 1993–1997
 Danny J. Holmes, 1997–2001
 Bryan Sievers, 2001–2003
 Lance Horbach, 2003–2013
 John Forbes, 2013–present

References

040